Synchronized swimming competitions at the 2011 Pan American Games in Guadalajara were held from October 18 to October 21, at the Scotiabank Aquatics Center. The winning team, Canada, qualified its country to compete at the 2012 Summer Olympics in London, Great Britain.

Medal summary

Medal table

Events

Schedule
All times are Central Daylight time (UTC-5).

Qualifying Criteria 
Eight teams and twelve duets will compete. The United States, Canada and hosts Mexico get automatic berths, while the remaining nations had to qualify through regional events.

Team

Duet

References

 
Events at the 2011 Pan American Games
2011
Pan American Games
Qualification for the 2011 Pan American Games